Jeanne des Armoises (also Claude des Armoises) was a French adventurer living in the 15th century. She was reportedly a soldier in the Pope's army in Italy.

Following Joan of Arc's execution, several young women came forward claiming to be the Maid, including Claude des Armoises.  In 1434 Joan of Arc's brothers Pierre and Jean temporarily accepted Jeanne des Armoises as the actual Joan.  Over the next six years, the brothers and their "sister" traveled from town to town, beginning at Orléans, receiving lavish gifts from Joan's many admirers, among them, Princess Elizabeth of Luxembourg (1390-1451), and Elisabeth von Görlitz, widow of Prince Anton of Burgundy.  Then Jeanne made the mistake of meeting with Charles VII of France in Paris.  Unable to tell him the "secret" Joan had told him - which proved to Charles that Joan had been sent by God to defeat the English - Jeanne confessed to the subterfuge, and begged the king's forgiveness.

Jeanne married the knight Robert des Armoises. She retired to his castle at Jaulny and had two children.

References

Sources

Impostors
Female wartime cross-dressers
Women in 15th-century warfare
15th-century soldiers
Women in medieval European warfare
Women in war in France
Medieval French military personnel